The Duden is a dictionary of the Standard High German language, first published by Konrad Duden in 1880, and later by Bibliographisches Institut GmbH. The Duden is updated regularly with new editions appearing every four or five years. , it is in its 28th edition. It is printed as twelve volumes, with each volume covering different aspects of the German language such as loanwords, etymology, pronunciation, synonyms, etc.

The first of these volumes,  (English: The German orthography), has long been the prescriptive source for Standard High German spelling. The Duden has become the preeminent language resource of the Standard High German language, stating the definitive set of rules regarding grammar, spelling and use of Standard High German language.

History

Konrad Duden's Schleizer Duden (1872) and Urduden (1880)
That book included both a dictionary and spelling rules for school use.

Eight years later, having moved to the grammar school in Hersfeld as headmaster, Konrad Duden's main work was published, considerably expanded from the Schleizer Duden. The first edition of this new work,  (Complete Orthographical Dictionary of the German Language), later sometimes referred to by the publisher as Urduden, was published in Leipzig and was the first major complete dictionary of German. This first "Duden" collected 28,000 keywords on 187 pages and subsequently prevailed throughout the German Empire as a standard reference work. From 1892, its spellings also became binding in Switzerland.

From 1901 to 1996
In 1902, the Bundesrat confirmed the Duden as the official standard for German spelling; Austria-Hungary and Switzerland soon followed suit. In the ensuing decades, the Duden continued to be the de facto standard for German orthography. After World War II this tradition continued separately in East and West Germany, in Leipzig and Mannheim, respectively.

In West Germany, some publishing houses began to attack the Duden "monopoly" in the 1950s, publishing dictionaries which contained alternative spellings. In reaction, in November 1955, the ministers of culture of the states of Germany confirmed the spellings given by the Duden would continue to be the official standard.

East German Duden (Leipzig)

In 1954, the first published Duden appeared in Mannheim, the western counterpart to the traditional Duden printing city of Leipzig. The first East German Duden appeared in Leipzig in 1951, but was largely ignored as illegitimate by West Germany. 

The printing continued in both Mannheim and Leipzig until the fall of the Berlin Wall in 1989.  The differences between the two versions of Duden printed during this period appear in the number of entries. As the printing of the two Dudens began, in 1954 and 1951, the number of  included was roughly the same. 

The major differences between the two Dudens are seen in the lexical entries. 

Also new to the East German Duden were words stemming from Soviet agricultural and industrial organization and practices. Of note, there are a few semantic changes recorded in the East German Duden that evolved from contact with Russian. 

The East German Duden records the nominalization of German words by adding the suffix , borrowed from the Russian language suffix. 

The few lexical and semantic items recorded in the East German Duden migrated from  because the printing press in Leipzig did not publish the multiple volume Duden which has become the current standard.

Reform Duden

On the cover of the Duden, 25th Edition, Volume 1, these words are printed in red letters: . This translates as: "The comprehensive standard reference based on the current official rules."

The "current official rules" are the result of the German orthography reform of 1996.

Volumes
  – The German Orthography (Spelling Dictionary)
  – The Dictionary of Style
  – The Pictorial Dictionary
  – The Grammar
  – The Dictionary of Foreign Words
  – The Pronouncing Dictionary
  – The Etymological Dictionary
  – The Synonym-Dictionary (Thesaurus)
  – Correct and Good German (Guide to usage)
  – The Meaning-Dictionary (Definitions)
  – Figures of Speech
  – Quotations and Sayings

References

Literature
 Betz, Werner.  [Modified language of the world: semantics, politics and manipulation]. Edition Interfrom AG: Zürich, 1977.
 Hellmann, Manfred W. (ed.)  [On public usage in the Federal Republic of Germany and in the GDR]. Düsseldorf: Pädagogischer Verlag Schwann, 1973.
 Reich, Hans H.  [Language and politics: studies on vocabulary and terminology of the official use of language in the GDR].  Munich: Max Hueber Verlag, 1968.
 Schlosser, Horst Dieter (ed).  [Communications requirements and everyday language in the former GDR].  Hamburg: Helmut Buske Verlag, 1991.
 Siegl, Elke Annalene.  [Duden East, Duden West: On language in Germany since 1945: a comparison of Leipzig and Mannheim editions of Duden since 1947]. Düsseldorf: Schwann, 1989.

External links

  

1880 non-fiction books
German dictionaries
German language
Spelling dictionaries